Krummenau railway station is a railway station in Nesslau, in the Swiss canton of St. Gallen. It is an intermediate station on the Bodensee–Toggenburg railway and is served by local trains only.

Services 
Krummenau is served by the S2 of the St. Gallen S-Bahn:

 : hourly service over the Bodensee–Toggenburg railway between Nesslau-Neu St. Johann and Altstätten SG.

References

External links 
 
 Krummenau station on SBB

Railway stations in the canton of St. Gallen
Südostbahn stations